Remote infrared audible signage (RIAS) was developed by Smith-Kettlewell Eye Research Institute (as Talking SignsR) so that print-disabled people, such as those that are  blind or have low-vision, or are illiterate, foreign, or visually impaired, would be able to access the same type of information available through textual print signs within the built environment.

It consists of infrared transmitters repeatedly sending encoded spoken versions of the contents of the sign through wireless communication. An early version in 1979 called "Talking Lights" has been successfully upgraded/marketed commercially as "Talking Signs" which are being globally installed.

An associated handheld or glasses-mounted IR receiver is directionally sensitive to a direct, line-of-sight infrared light beam and orients the person by giving more positive feedback when the sign is being pointed to directly and is close.

The system has been tested and works effectively in both interior and exterior settings and does not disturb those environments because the IR beams are invisible and silent.

The principle of Alexander Graham Bell's photophone led to development of devices capable of transmitting/decoding infrared waves in systems ranging from military communications through remote control systems for televisions and computers.

Standardization
RIAS features in US building code 703.7. This is quoted in a report  for the U.S. Access Board as follows:

References

Notes
Introduction to RIAS:  Smith-Kettlewell RIAS research
izmir tabela
University of California, Santa Barbara - RIAS research
University of California, Santa Barbara Dept. of Geography - Dissertation on RIAS

Assistive technology
Accessible information
Speech synthesis
Blindness equipment